Brachyhypopomus bennetti is a species of electric knifefish. The species was discovered in the Central Amazon.

References

Hypopomidae
Weakly electric fish
Fish of South America
Fish described in 2013